Heřmánky is a municipality and village in the Nový Jičín District in the Moravian-Silesian Region of the Czech Republic. It has about 200 inhabitants.

History
The first written mention of Heřmánky is from 1362.

References

Villages in Nový Jičín District